Worldview Entertainment is an American independent motion picture company that finances and produces theatrical quality feature films for worldwide distribution. The company was founded in 2007 and is based in New York City. Worldview has produced films including Child 44, Birdman, Blood Ties, The Green Inferno, and Killer Joe.

History
Worldview Entertainment was founded in 2007 by Chairman and CEO, Christopher Woodrow, and Maria Cestone. Molly Conners joined the company in 2009 as COO. Worldview Entertainment signed with Creative Artists Agency (CAA) in 2010 and has since become the agency's top film finance and production client. Sarah E. Johnson, daughter of Franklin Resources Chairman, Charles B. Johnson, became a partner and investor in the company in 2011. Worldview established a four-year $30 million credit facility with Comerica in 2013 to provide debt financing for the company's films, which coincided with the infusion of $40 million in new equity from existing investors. The $70 million doubled the company's capital base.

The company's first film was William Friedkin's black comedy, Killer Joe, which it financed along with Voltage Pictures in 2010. The film premiered at the 2011 Venice Film Festival before making its North American debut at the Toronto International Film Festival, where it was sold domestically to LD Entertainment in one of the biggest sales at the festival. The film was distributed theatrically in the summer of 2012 with star Matthew McConaughey receiving a nomination for an Independent Spirit Award as Best Male Lead.

Worldview's 2012 slate included three films that premiered at the 2013 Cannes Film Festival including the Guillaume Canet crime thriller, Blood Ties, which was the biggest domestic sale at the festival after being purchased by Lionsgate and Roadside Attractions; and James Gray's period drama, The Immigrant which was sold domestically to The Weinstein Company. The Company went on to premiere two films at the 2013 Venice Film Festival, including David Gordon Green's drama Joe, which was sold domestically to Lionsgate and Roadside Attractions. Worldview also premiered six films at the 2013 Toronto International Film Festival including the West Memphis Three crime thriller, Devil's Knot, which was sold domestically to Image Entertainment; and Eli Roth's horror thriller, The Green Inferno, which was sold domestically to Open Road Films.

The company's 2014 slate included Alejandro González Iñárritu's comedy, Birdman, with Fox Searchlight and New Regency; Daniel Espinosa's crime thriller Child 44, with Summit and Lionsgate; Zach Braff's drama Wish I Was Here; and Michel Hazanavicius's drama The Search.

Worldview's upcoming projects include Andrew Dominik's Marilyn Monroe biopic Blonde, and the sequel to The Green Inferno franchise, Beyond the Green Inferno.

Filmography

References

External links
Worldview Entertainment on the Internet Movie Database

Film production companies of the United States